Boa Viagem Esporte Clube, commonly known as Boa Viagem, is a Brazilian football club based in Boa Viagem, Ceará state.

History
The club was founded on December 22, 1999. They finished in the second position in the Campeonato Cearense Second Level in 2000, when they lost the competition to Itapajé, and in 2007, when they lost the competition to Horizonte.

Stadium
Boa Viagem Esporte Clube play their home games at Estádio Municipal Segismundo Rodrigues Neto, nicknamed Serjão. The stadium has a maximum capacity of 5,000 people.

References

Association football clubs established in 1999
Football clubs in Ceará
1999 establishments in Brazil